David Tait (5 July 1987 – 12 December 2012) was a professional rugby union player for Sale Sharks in the Guinness Premiership.

Career
Tait played as a Number 8, although he could also operate as a Flanker. He also represented Scotland at rugby sevens. Tait made his Sale debut in a Powergen Cup match against Llanelli Scarlets. He "left the club in 2010 after suffering persistent injuries, having made just 40 appearances".

Tait represented the England Under 20 team. He was called up to the England sevens training squad for the 2008–09 IRB Sevens World Series. However, Tait did not represent England and later competed for Scotland at the 2009 Dubai Sevens.

In November 2011, Tait started a career at KPMG Hong Kong in the Corporate Finance team. While there, he also became captain for the Kowloon RFC first fifteen. He went on to lead the first team to their first Hong Kong Premiership League title in 30 years, during the 2011–2012 season.

Personal life
Tait was born in Sale, Greater Manchester, England, where he attended Sale Grammar School. Later he attended Sedbergh School and took a history degree at Manchester University. He was of Scottish descent on his father's side. His father Campbell Tait, a judge, hanged himself in 2004.

Death
Tait died in an apparent suicide after falling from the roof of the Harbourview Horizon apartment block in Hung Hom, Hong Kong, on 12 December 2012. The Hong Kong national rugby union team wore black armbands during the 2012 Cup of Nations in his memory.

References

External links
Sale Sharks profile
Scotland profile

1987 births
2012 deaths
2012 suicides
English rugby union players
Rugby union number eights
Rugby union players from Sale, Greater Manchester
Sale Sharks players
English people of Scottish descent
People educated at Sedbergh School
Alumni of the University of Manchester
English expatriates in Hong Kong
Suicides in Hong Kong
Deaths from falls
Male rugby sevens players
Scotland international rugby sevens players